Rogue Agent is a 2022 British mystery drama thriller film directed by Adam Patterson and Declan Lawn from a screenplay the pair co-wrote with Michael Bronner, based on the article "Chasing Agent Freegard" by Michael Bronner. James Norton portrays Robert Hendy-Freegard, a conman who tricked and convinced several people that he was an MI5 agent. Gemma Arterton also stars as the person who brought him down, with additional cast members including Shazad Latif, Marisa Abela, Edwina Findley and Julian Barratt.

The film was released in the United Kingdom on 27 July 2022 on Netflix.

Premise
The film is based on Robert Hendy-Freegard, who masqueraded as an MI5 agent and fooled several people into going underground for fear of assassination by the IRA.

Cast

 James Norton as Robert Freegard
 Gemma Arterton as Alice Archer
 Marisa Abela as Sophie Jones
 Sarah Goldberg as Jenny Jackson
 Shazad Latif as Sonny Chandra
 Jimmy Akingbola as Andrew
 Freya Mavor as Mae Hansen
 Edwina Findley as Special Agent Sandy Harland
 Julian Barratt as Phil

Production
On 22 January 2019, it was announced that James Norton would star in Chasing Agent Freegard, as one of three films produced between Great Point Media and The Development Partnership, with Norton producing through his own production company Rabbit Track Pictures. By June 2020, Adam Patterson and Declan Lawn were attached to co-direct the feature from a screenplay by Michael Bronner. In May 2021, it was reported that Night Train Media would also finance the film, then retitled Freegard, and that Gemma Arterton, Shazad Latif, Marisa Abela, Edwina Findley and Julian Barratt had joined the cast. Filming commenced in London on 31 May 2021. Filming took place at Dover Castle and Dover Lighthouse. That July, Sarah Goldberg, Jimmy Akingbola, Freya Mavor, Rob Malone, Philip Wright, Michael Fenton Stevens and Charlotte Avery were added to the cast. According to Variety Insight, the film's budget is less than $10 million. After six weeks, Lawn announced that principal photography had concluded on 12 July 2021. The film was later retitled again to Rogue Agent.

Release
In the United Kingdom, the film was released on 27 July 2022 on Netflix. In the United States, the film was released in cinemas by IFC Films and on streaming on AMC+ on 12 August 2022.

Reception
On the review aggregator website Rotten Tomatoes, the film received a 73% approval rating, based on 40 reviews, with an average rating of 6.5/10. The website's consensus reads, "Even if it isn't as engaging as the real-life story that inspired it, Rogue Agent remains a well-acted and appealingly twisty suspense thriller." On Metacritic, the film received a score of 61 out of 100, based on 11 reviews, indicating "generally favorable reviews".

References

External links
 
2022 crime drama films
2020s English-language films
2020s British films
British action films
British crime films
British thriller films
Crime films based on actual events
Films about real people
Films shot in London
IFC Films films